The cream-browed white-eye (Heleia superciliaris), also known as the cream-browed ibon or yellow-browed white-eye, is a species of bird in the family Zosteropidae.  It is endemic to the Lesser Sunda Islands. Its natural habitat is subtropical or tropical moist montane forest.

References

cream-browed white-eye
Birds of Flores
Birds of the Lesser Sunda Islands
cream-browed white-eye
Taxonomy articles created by Polbot